John Ferguson Page (27 March 1900 – 14 February 1947) was a British figure skater who competed in the 1924 Winter Olympics and in the 1928 Winter Olympics. He was born in Brooklands, Sale, Manchester, and died in Manchester. In 1924 he finished fifth in the singles event. In the pairs competition he and his partner Ethel Muckelt finished fourth. Four years later he finished ninth in the singles event at the St. Moritz Games and with his partner Ethel Muckelt he finished seventh in the pairs competition.

Results

Men's singles

Pairs with Muckelt

References

External links
 

1900 births
1947 deaths
British male single skaters
British male pair skaters
Olympic figure skaters of Great Britain
Figure skaters at the 1924 Winter Olympics
Figure skaters at the 1928 Winter Olympics
Sportspeople from Manchester
World Figure Skating Championships medalists